Stanley station or Stanley railway station may refer to:

Stanley station (North Dakota), an Amtrak station in Stanley, North Dakota, United States
Stanley railway station (Liverpool), a former railway station in Liverpool, England
Stanley (West Yorkshire) railway station, a former railway station in Stanley, West Yorkshire, England
Stanley (SMJR) railway station, a former railway station in Stanley, Perthshire, Scotland

See also
Stanley (disambiguation)
Stanely railway station, a former railway station in Paisley, Renfrewshire, Scotland
Stanley Park railway station, a proposed railway station in Liverpool, England
Old Stanley Police Station, a former police station in Stanley, Hong Kong
West Stanley railway station, a former railway station in Stanley, Durham, England